The following 18 or more  state parks, monuments, and recreation areas are
managed by the Hawai'i Department of Land and Natural Resources:

Hawaii (island) 
 ʻAkaka Falls State Park 
 Hapuna Beach State Recreation Area 
 Huliheʻe Palace
 Kalopa State Recreation Area 
 Kealakekua Bay State Historical Park 
 Kekaha Kai (Kona Coast) State Park 
 Kīholo State Park Reserve
 Kohala Historical Sites State Monument 
 Lapakahi State Historical Park 
 Lava Tree State Monument 
 MacKenzie State Recreation Area 
 Manuka State Wayside Park 
 Mauna Kea Ice Age Reserve 
 Mauna Kea State Recreation Area 
 Old Kona Airport State Recreation Area 
 Wailoa River State Recreation Area 
 Wailuku River State Park / Rainbow Falls

Kauai 
 Ahukini State Recreation Pier 
 Haʻena State Park 
 Kōkeʻe State Park 
 Nā Pali Coast State Park 
 Polihale State Park 
 Russian Fort Elizabeth State Historical Park 
 Wailua River State Park  
 Waimea Canyon State Park 
 Waimea State Recreational Pier

Maui 
 Halekiʻi-Pihana Heiau State Monument 
 Īao Valley State Monument 
 Kaumahina State Wayside Park 
 Makena State Park 
 Polipoli Spring State Recreation Area 
 Puaʻa Kaʻa State Wayside Park 
 Waiʻanapanapa State Park 
 Wailua Valley State Wayside Park

Moloka‘i 
 Palaʻau State Park

Oahu 
 Ahupuaʻa O Kahana State Park 
 ʻAiea Bay State Recreation Area  
 Diamond Head State Monument 
 Hanauma Bay Nature Preserve 
 Heʻeia State Park 
 ʻIolani Palace State Monument 
 Ka'ena Point State Park 
 Kaiwi State Scenic Shoreline
 Kaka'ako Waterfront Park 
 Keaʻiwa Heiau State Recreation Area 
 Kewalo Basin 
 Kukaniloko Birthstones State Monument 
 Lāʻie Point State Wayside 
 Makapuʻu Point State Wayside 
 Mālaekahana State Recreation Area 
 Nuʻuanu Pali State Wayside 
 Puʻu o Mahuka Heiau State Monument 
 Puʻu ʻUalakaʻa State Wayside 
 Queen Emma Summer Palace
 Royal Mausoleum State Monument 
 Sacred Falls State Park 
 Sand Island State Recreation Area 
 Ulupō Heiau State Historic Site 
 Waʻahila Ridge State Recreation Area 
 Wahiawā Freshwater State Recreation Area

See also
Civilian Conservation Corps Camp in Kokeʻe State Park
Natural Area Reserves System Hawaii

External links
Division of State Parks, State of Hawaii

State parks
Hawaii